"Love Is Contagious" is the debut single by American singer Taja Sevelle, released in 1987. The song was taken from her eponymous debut studio album, released by Paisley Park Records. It is Sevelle's only major chart hit, reaching number 7 on the UK Singles Chart in early 1988.

Track listing
7" single
"Love Is Contagious (Edit)"
"Mama 16 (Edit)"

12" single
"Love Is Contagious (Extended Mix)"
"Mama 16 (Edit)"
"Love Is Contagious (Instrumental Dub)"

Chart positions

References

External links

1987 songs
1987 debut singles
Paisley Park Records singles